The golden bee shrimp is a species of shrimp found in southern China, including Hong Kong . It is one of many varieties of Bee shrimp.

Appearance
The shrimp has a white outside shell and the flesh is an orange/golden color. Females are larger than males and the female's eggs are brown. The offspring are the same color as their parents when they emerge from the eggs .

References

Atyidae
Crustaceans described in 1938